The United States Army Forces in the Philippines – Northern Luzon or United States Armed Forces in the Philippines – Northern Luzon (USAFIP-NL) (Tagalog: Sandatahang Lakas ng Estados Unidos sa Pilipinas - Hilagang Luzon (SLEUP-HL)/Hukbong Sandatahan ng Estados Unidos sa Pilipinas - Hilagang Luzon (HSEUP-HL) Ilocano: Fuerza Armada ti Estados Unidos iti Filipinas - Amianan ti Luzon (FAEUF-AL)) was the military and guerrilla organization active in the Philippines after the Japanese occupation. It was made up of United States Army and Philippine Army soldiers, reservists and civilian volunteers.

It was active from January 1, 1942 to June 30, 1946 and commanded by Col. Moses, followed by Russell W. Volckmann.

Following the Japanese occupation of the Philippines through the campaign to liberate the country, the military and guerrilla operations from the units of USAFIP-NL operated in Northern Luzon, including the some provinces in Ilocos Norte, Ilocos Sur, La Union, Abra, Mountain Province, Cagayan, Isabela and Nueva Vizcaya.

Formations 
Infantry regiments
11th Infantry Regiment – Cagayan Valley
14th Infantry Regiment – Nueva Vizcaya
15th Infantry Regiment – Ilocos Norte
66th Infantry Regiment – Baguio and Southern Mountain Province (now. Benguet) 
121st Infantry Regiment – Ilocos Sur and La Union

Military battalions
Field Artillery Battalion
Engineer Combat Battalion
Military Police Battalion
Quartermaster Battalion
Replacement and Casualty Battalion
Tank Battalion

From November 1943 the forces were organized as districts.

1st District – Major Parker Calvert
2nd, 3rd Districts – Major George Barnett
4th District – Major Ralph Praeger
5th District – Major Romulo Manriquez
6th District – Capt. Robert Lapham (Lapham did not accept Volckmann's authority and operated the Luzon Guerrilla Army Forces [LGAF] independently.) 
7th District – Volckmann and Blackburn

Reorganization
Following the Japanese surrender, an in preparation for Philippine independence, the USAFIP, NL, was reorganized as a regular division.  It was designated the 2nd Division Philippine Army.

See also 
List of American guerrillas in the Philippines

References

External links 
Our Igorot Fathers, The Heroes: The Untold Story of the 66th Infantry Regiment, USAFIP-NL (blog entry about video documentary)

Military history of the Philippines during World War II
Guerrilla organizations
World War II resistance movements